Tristan D (born Tristan Dorian, 7 March 1988, Brighton) is a British trance DJ and EDM producer from Brighton, England.

Career
Tristan's DJ career began in 2001 in the form of self promoted club nights called Twisted, based in Brighton and London. Tristan's reputation was kick-started at these events and he landed a residency at London club night Peach at Heaven  shortly after, playing alongside the likes of Eddie Halliwell, Simon Patterson and Markus Schulz.

Tristan built close links to DJ Judge Jules and he played his first set at Judgement Sundays club night in Eden, San Antonio, Ibiza in 2007 and has been a resident DJ there since 2009. He also plays at Judgement Mondays in BCM Planet Dance, Palma, Majorca.

Tristan's career as a music producer began in 2008 in the shape of a collaboration with Anthony Brooks called Do You Know Who I Am? on Big In Ibiza records. Since then, Tristan has gone on to release 4 singles under his own name, including the most recent Pacific Beach on High Contrast records. He is also credited with remixing several tracks including In The Air by TV Rock feat. Rudy. 
Tristan's music is often played on Judge Jules' BBC Radio show, where he has been interviewed on air for show features.

Production Aliases
Tristan is also involved in several other projects with Judge Jules under the pseudonym of J&T Project, where they specialise in remixes.

Previous aliases have included, Tristan De Cunha.

Podcast
Tristan produces a podcast 'The Weekly Verdict', available on iTunes, where he showcases 20 minutes of the latest EDM tracks.

Discography

Singles
 2008 - Do You Know Who I Am - Anthony Brooks & Tristan D
 2010 - 2012 - Tristan D
 2010 - The Morning After - Tristan D
 2011 - Interstate 5 - Tristan D
 2011 - Pacific Beach - Tristan D
 2012 - Island Of Dreams - Garry Heaney & Tristan D
 2013 - Vertigo - (Tristan D & Tangle present Nu-State)

Remixes
 2009 - Chakalaka - Wippenberg (Tristan D remix)
 2010 - In The Air - TV Rock feat. Rudy (Tristan D remix)
 2010 - Orko - Tigran Oganezov (Tristan D remix)
 2011 - Lunar Love - Vicky Devine & Nick Larson (Tristan D remix)
 2011 - Video Games - Lana Del Ray (J&T Project remix)
 2012 - Chase & Status - End Credits (J&T Project Remix)
 2012 - Blue Jeans - Lana Del Rey (J&T Project Remix)
 2012 - Lights - Ellie Goulding (J&T Project Remix)

References

External links 
 Tristand.net

 JudgementSundays.co.uk
 iTunes Podcast
 Beatport
 Discogs Release Discography
 Discogs Remix Credits

Living people
Club DJs
British radio DJs
British dance musicians
Place of birth missing (living people)
1988 births